April 2014

See also

References

 04
April 2014 events in the United States